Mangogrostix is a genus of midges in the family Cecidomyiidae. There are two described species in this genus. It was established by Russian entomologist Boris Mamaev in 1985.

Species
Mangogrostix bharatae (Sharma & Rao, 1979)
Mangogrostix orientalis (Grover, 1964)

References

Cecidomyiidae genera
Insects described in 1985
Taxa named by Boris Mamaev